The MicroDigital Omega was a home computer developed and sold in the early 2000s by MicroDigital. It runs the RISC OS operating system.

The Omega suffered a protracted development, announced in 2000, it was released in 2003.

References

External links
Foundation - Alpha Omega
Steffen Huber - Benchmarks - MicroDigital Omega vs. Castle IYONIX pc
RiscWorld - MicroDigital Omega Press Day
MicroDigital - The NewsDesk - Saturday 12 July 2003
The Qube RiscOS Server - Acorn and Related Systems - MicroDigital Omega
RISC OS User Group Of London - OMEGeddon!
RiscWorld - The MicroDigital Omega
Drobe - MicroDigital's Omega priorities
Drobe - MicroDigital's domain expires
Drobe - MicroDigital sought by bailiffs
Drobe - MicroDigital incommunicado

RISC OS
ARM-based home computers
Microcomputers